Daniel Arzani (born 4 January 1999) is a professional footballer who plays as an attacking midfielder and winger for A-League Men club Macarthur FC. Born in Iran, he represents the Australia national team.

Club career

Sydney FC
Daniel Arzani played for the youth team of Sydney FC in 2016.

Melbourne City FC

2016–17 season
Arzani started playing for Melbourne City in 2016. On 28 January 2017, Arzani scored a goal for Melbourne City Youth in the Grand Final to win the 2016–17 A-League National Youth League.

2017–18 season
On 6 January 2018 during their 2017–18 season, Arzani was brought on as a substitute with the senior side and provided two assists in a 2–1 comeback win against Wellington Phoenix FC. He provided two more assists in his first senior start on 9 January against Perth Glory FC. Arzani scored his first A-League goal on 25 January 2018 against Newcastle Jets FC. After just four starts from his club's 18 league games, Arzani led his team for the most successful dribbles with 31. He won the A-League player of the month award for his performances in January. By April 2018, Arzani led the league in successful dribbles with 89, provided the most assists out of all under-23 players in the league, and was nominated for the A-League Young Footballer of the Year award. At the conclusion of the season, it was announced that he won the award. He was subsequently named in the A-League Team of the Season. In July 2018, Arzani won the Harry Kewell Medal for the best Australian male under-23 player.

Manchester City
On 9 August 2018, Arzani moved from Melbourne City to fellow City Football Group club Manchester City, with his new club indicating they intended to loan him to another side.

Loan to Celtic
On 17 August 2018, Arzani was loaned to Scottish champions Celtic on a two-year loan deal. Arzani scored a free kick for the Celtic Academy on 17 September 2018 against Aberdeen. He was given his first team debut by manager Brendan Rodgers on 31 October 2018 in a Scottish Premiership match against Dundee. He suffered a torn ACL on debut, ruling him out for the 2019 AFC Asian Cup and the rest of the Celtic season, as well as the 2020 AFC U-23 Championship. Arzani made his return from injury on 17 September 2019 in a Celtic reserves match against Hibernian. He made his return to the Celtic first team on 18 January 2020 under manager Neil Lennon in a Scottish Cup match against Partick Thistle. Arzani scored his final goal for Celtic in a reserves match against English Championship side Middlesbrough on 11 February 2020.

Loan to Utrecht
On 7 August 2020, Arzani joined Dutch Eredivisie side FC Utrecht on loan ahead of their 2020–21 season. He made his club debut in a friendly match against the Go Ahead Eagles the following day on 8 August 2020. He provided his first assist for the club in his following friendly match against AFC Ajax at the Johan Cruyff Arena on 13 August 2020 and made his Eredivisie debut in their opening match at VVV-Venlo on 18 September 2020. He had his first assist in the Eredivisie from a corner on 27 September 2020 during his next match against RKC Waalwijk. Arzani subsequently made his Jong Utrecht debut on 19 October 2020 against Jong Ajax before making his Dutch Cup debut for the senior team against FC Dordrecht on 27 October 2020 with an assist to Sander van de Streek. Arzani scored his first goal for Jong Utrecht on 4 December 2020 in a league match against Almere City FC.

Loan to Aarhus
On 26 January 2021, Arzani joined AGF in the Danish Superliga on loan during the 2020–21 season. He scored a goal on his club debut in a friendly match against AC Horsens on 3 February 2021 and made his league debut against Lyngby on 7 February 2021. He made his Danish Cup debut in the following match on 10 February against B.93 Copenhagen. Arzani made two appearances for the reserve side within his first month, scoring in both matches. He made his final appearance of the season on 28 May 2021 in a European play-off match against AaB, helping his team reach the qualification rounds of the inaugural UEFA Europa Conference League.

Loan to Lommel
On 19 August 2021, Arzani joined City Football Group-owned Lommel SK in the Belgian second division on loan, scoring a goal on his club debut during a trial on 8 August in a friendly match against Eredivisie side RKC Waalwijk. He made his competitive debut for the club on 21 August in a league match against Mouscron during the 2021–22 season. Arzani scored his first league goal for the club on 11 December 2021 against Mouscron at the Stade Le Canonnier.

Macarthur FC
On 26 July 2022, Arzani joined Macarthur FC ahead of the 2022–23 A-League Men season. He made his club debut on 30 July 2022, scoring a goal and providing two assists in an Australia Cup match against Magpies Crusaders. Arzani contributed to three goals in the semi-final on 14 September 2022 against Oakleigh Cannons FC, scoring two goals and winning a penalty that was scored by Ulises Dávila, helping his team reach their first-ever final. On 1 October 2022, Arzani helped lead Macarthur to their first-ever trophy in club history by winning the 2022 Australia Cup Final. Arzani scored his first league goal for the club and provided an assist in their home opener on 16 October 2022 against Adelaide United in Campbelltown Stadium, with his goal celebration being in support of the Mahsa Amini protests. By November 2022, Arzani led the league in successful dribbles for the season after five league matches.

International career

Youth
Arzani has played for Australia at the under-17, under-20 and under-23 levels, and was called into Australia's 2014 AFC U-16 Championship and 2015 FIFA U-17 World Cup squads. Due to his Iranian heritage, Arzani was eligible to represent both Iran and Australia at international level. In February 2018, Arzani stated that he was leaning more towards representing Australia over Iran.

Arzani returned to the under-23 team in October 2019 for Australia's Olympic qualifying preparations ahead of the 2020 AFC U-23 Championship. Manager Graham Arnold stated Arzani would be missing the tournament due to his ongoing recovery process before noting that he could be added to their Olympic squad should Australia qualify.

Arzani scored his first goal for the under-23 team on 12 June 2021, scoring a brace in a friendly match against Mexico during Olympic preparations in Marbella. On 28 June 2021, Arzani was named in the Olyroos Olympic squad. He made his Olympic debut on 22 July 2021, starting the match and playing 79 minutes in a 2–0 win over Argentina at the Sapporo Dome. Arzani played in all three group stage matches against Argentina, Spain, and Egypt.

Senior
At the age of 19, Arzani was called into Australia's preliminary squad for the 2018 FIFA World Cup on 7 May 2018. He made his international debut for Australia as an 84th-minute substitute for Mathew Leckie in a friendly match against the Czech Republic on 1 June 2018. He was named in Bert van Marwijk’s final 23-man squad for the 2018 World Cup the following day, becoming the youngest ever Australian player in a World Cup squad as well as the youngest player overall at the 2018 World Cup. Arzani scored his first international goal for Australia one minute after being substituted on in the next friendly match for a 2–1 win against Hungary on 9 June 2018. He made his World Cup debut on 16 June 2018 as an 84th minute substitute against France. At the age of 19 years and 163 days he became the youngest player to ever make a World Cup appearance for Australia. Arzani was used as a substitute in all three World Cup matches against France, Denmark and Peru.

In August 2021, Arzani was called into the Australia squad for the start of the third round of 2022 FIFA World Cup qualifiers.

Style of play
Arzani has been praised for his quick speed and skillful dribbling, capable of playing across either wing or in behind the striker. He played street football and futsal from a young age.

Outside football

Personal life
Born in Iran to Sima and John Arzani along with his brother Ben, Daniel moved to Australia with his family at the age of seven and was raised in Sydney before moving to Melbourne. He is fluent in English and Persian. Arzani is a former student of Sydney Boys High School and La Trobe University.

Sponsorship
Arzani has a contract with American sportswear supplier Nike.

Career statistics

Club

International

Scores and results list Australia’s goal tally first, score column indicates score after each Arzani goal.

Honours
Melbourne City
National Youth League: 2016–17

Macarthur FC
Australia Cup: 2022

Individual
A-League Young Footballer of the Year: 2017–18
PFA A-League Team of the Season: 2017–18
PFA Harry Kewell Medal: 2017–18

References

External links

 
 

1999 births
Living people
People from Khorramabad
Australian soccer players
Australia international soccer players
Australian people of Iranian descent
Iranian footballers
Association football midfielders
Sydney FC players
Melbourne City FC players
Manchester City F.C. players
Celtic F.C. players
FC Utrecht players
Jong FC Utrecht players
Aarhus Gymnastikforening players
Lommel S.K. players
Macarthur FC players
Expatriate footballers in Scotland
Expatriate footballers in the Netherlands
Expatriate men's footballers in Denmark
Australian expatriate sportspeople in Scotland
Australian expatriate sportspeople in the Netherlands
Australian expatriate sportspeople in Denmark
Scottish Professional Football League players
A-League Men players
National Premier Leagues players
Eredivisie players
Eerste Divisie players
Danish Superliga players
2018 FIFA World Cup players
People educated at Sydney Boys High School
La Trobe University alumni
Sportspeople of Iranian descent
Association football wingers
Iranian expatriate sportspeople in Australia
Footballers at the 2020 Summer Olympics
Olympic soccer players of Australia
Australian expatriate sportspeople in England